Ambrose Byron Broadbent (born near Cadiz, Kentucky, Nov. 21, 1885; died Clarksville, Tennessee, June 15, 1952) was an American lawyer, Democratic politician, and judge in the state of Tennessee. He served as the speaker of the Tennessee Senate from 1931–33 and Secretary of State from 1937-1941.

Early life
Broadbent was born on a farm outside Cadiz, Kentucky. His father Peter Harris Broadbent (1859-1956) and his mother Katherine "Kitty" Jones Broadbent (1862-1949) were both long-lived, with his father out-living his son. Broadbent attended public schools and then received an LLB from Cumberland School of Law in Lebanon, Tennessee in 1912. After setting up practice in Clarksville, Tennessee close to his parents' home, Broadbent became involved in Tennessee Democratic politics. In 1917 he and fellow Clarksville lawyer Austin Peay were charter members of the Clarksville Rotary Club.

Career
Broadbent managed the campaigns for governor of Austin Peay in 1922, 1924, and 1926, and that of Gordon Browning in 1936. In 1928 he served as a delegate to the Democratic National Convention. From 1931 to 1935 he served in the Tennessee state senate, and he was elected speaker for the 1931-33 session after the resignation of Scott Fitzhugh. Broadbent was elected speaker at a time when Governor Henry Hollis Horton was facing impeachment; Broadbent was considered to be an independent and an opponent of E. H. Crump, the Memphis political boss who was pushing for Horton's impeachment. The speaker of the senate also served as the successor to the governor in case of death or resignation, being effectively the lieutenant governor. From 1937 to 1941 he served as Tennessee Secretary of State. From 1945 to 1951 he served as a county court judge; from 1951 until his death, as a criminal court judge.

Broadbent married Belle Banister of Clarksville on Nov. 16, 1938. He is buried in Greenwood Cemetery in Clarksville.

Legacy
Broadbent is pictured on a mural at Austin Peay State University in Clarksville, as one of the civic leaders who suggested that the city purchase a vacant college campus and use it for a teachers' college.

References

1885 births
1952 deaths
People from Trigg County, Kentucky
People from Clarksville, Tennessee
Tennessee lawyers
Democratic Party Tennessee state senators
Secretaries of State of Tennessee
20th-century American politicians
20th-century American lawyers
20th-century American judges